Hasanuddin bin Mohd Yunus (Jawi: حسن الدين بن محمد يونس; born 5 December 1964) is a Malaysian politician who served as the Member of Parliament (MP) for Hulu Langat from May 2018 to November 2022. He is also Vice-President of the National Trust Party (AMANAH), a component party of the Pakatan Harapan (PH) opposition coalition and was a member of the Malaysian Islamic Party (PAS), then component party of the Barisan Alternatif (BA) and Pakatan Rakyat (PR) opposition coalitions. 

Hasanuddin had previously contested for the Johor State Legislative Assembly seat of Rengit in 1999, 2004 and 2008 general elections under the Malaysian Islamic Party's (PAS) ticket but lost all the contests to the then-ruling Barisan Nasional (BN) coalition. He did not participate in 2013 general elections.

Hasanuddin eventually won the Hulu Langat parliamentary seat in Selangor as a candidate of AMANAH in the 2018 general elections.

Election results

Honours
  :
  Knight Commander of the Order of the Territorial Crown (PMW) - Datuk (2019)

See also

National Trust Party (Malaysia)
Pakatan Harapan

References

External links
 Official Facebook Page

1964 births
Living people
People from Johor
Malaysian people of Malay descent
Malaysian Muslims
Selangor politicians
Malaysian Islamic Party politicians
Members of the Dewan Rakyat
21st-century Malaysian politicians
National Trust Party (Malaysia) politicians